Éva Szörényi (Born Elvira Schwáb; May 26, 1917 – December 1, 2009) was a Kossuth Prize-winning actress of the Hungarian National Theatre. Her acting career started in the early 1930s playing leading roles in over 20 motion pictures, a result of which she quickly became famous and beloved by the Hungarian people. Her voice also was heard frequently on the radio.

When the Hungarian Revolution of 1956 broke out, Szörényi actively participated in the events. After the November 4, 1956 Soviet invasion of Hungary she left her country with her family to escape communist persecution and settled with her husband, István Örményi, and three sons, István, Tamás and Gábor, in Los Angeles.

In exile, Szörényi played an active role in the World Federation of Hungarian Freedom Fighters (WFHFF). She vowed not to visit Hungary until the last occupying Soviet soldier had left Hungary. When that happened, she returned to Hungary for the first time in 1991.

Szörényi organized fund-raising events for WFHFF in the form of literary evenings, such as regular Széchenyi tea parties and others.  An active member of the Hungarian Freedom Fighters, she became the president of the Remember Hungary 1956 to commemorate the 50th anniversary of the revolution.

Éva Szörényi won awards from the presidents of Hungary Árpád Göncz, Ferenc Mádl and László Sólyom.

Awards
 Kossuth Prize - 1952
 Meritorious Artist - 1954
 Magyarország Kiváló Művésze díj - 1955

Filmography

 Erkel - 1952
 Könnyű múzsa - 1947
 Sarga Rozsa - 1941
 Nagymama - 1935
 Halalos tavasz - 1939
 Madach - 1944
 A Tanítónö - 1945
 Aranyora - 1946
 Uri muri - 1950
 Maria nover - 1937
 Egy lany elindul - 1937
 Puszta princess - 1939
 Tavaszi szonata - 1942
 Baratsagos arcot kerek - 1936
 Szeptember vegen - 1942
 Szivet szivert - ? 
 A Noszty fiu esete Toth Marival - 1938
 Benedekhaz - 1944
 Fuszer es csemege - 1940
 Elkesett level - 1941
 Leanyvari boszorkany - 1938
 Jelmezbal - 1942

Archive footage
 A Jávor - 1987

References

External links
 

1917 births
2009 deaths
Hungarian emigrants to the United States
Hungarian activists
Hungarian stage actresses
Hungarian film actresses
People from Greater Los Angeles
Artists of Merit of the Hungarian People's Republic